Ram Chandra Dattatraya Sathe (1923–2008) was Foreign Secretary (India). He served as secretary from 9 November 1979 to 30 April 1982.
 
He also served as ambassador to China (1966–1968), France (July, 1976 to November, 1978), Iran (November, 1978–1980) and Germany (1982–1984) and was a diplomat in Afghanistan and East Africa. His daughter Mohini, is married to Shivshankar Menon.

References

Indian Foreign Secretaries
Ambassadors of India to France
Ambassadors of India to Germany
Ambassadors of India to China
Ambassadors of India to Iran
2008 deaths
1923 births
National Defence College, India alumni